The Deacon's Daughter is a 1910 American silent film produced by Kalem Company and directed by Sidney Olcott.

Production notes
The film was shot in Jacksonville, Florida.

References
 The Moving Picture World, Vol 6, p 27, p 34, p 91
 The New York Dramatic Mirror, January 13, 1910, p 15
 Variety, January 15, 1910

External links
 AFI Catalog

 The Deacon's Daughter website dedicated to Sidney Olcott

1910 films
1910 drama films
1910 short films
American black-and-white films
American silent short films
Films directed by Sidney Olcott
Films set in Florida
Films shot in Jacksonville, Florida
Silent American drama films
1910s American films